The Pickwick Papers is a 1985 animated Australian film based on the 1837 novel of the same name by Charles Dickens.

Release
INI Entertainment Group Inc. licensed the film, alongside others in the International Family Classics library, to 20th Century Fox. To date, it's the only one known to have its rights utilized by the latter company, as it aired on HBO on June 14, 1989. It was released by GoodTimes Home Video on DVD, under license by INI's successor, Liberty International Entertainment.

References

External links
 

1985 films
Films based on The Pickwick Papers
GoodTimes Entertainment
Animated films based on novels
1980s Australian animated films
1980s English-language films
1980s Australian films